Isabelle Barciulli (born 21 April 1986) is an Italian rally driver and co-driver currently competing in the FIA E-Rally Regularity Cup. As a co-driver, she was the 2014 FIA Alternative Energies World Champion.

Biography 
Barciulli made her debut in the FIA Alternative Energies Cup as a driver in 2012 paired with Francesca Olivoni. She finished in fifth place at the Hi-Tech Ecomobility Rally in Athens and sixth at the Ecorally San Marino – Città del Vaticano, ending the season in ninth place in the overall standings. In the same year, she participated as co-driver in the Campionato Italiano Energie Alternative alongside Guido Guerrini. In 2013, she managed to score points both as a driver, finishing sixth with Olivoni at the Hi-Tech of Greece and at the Ecorally of San Marino and as a co-driver with Guerrini, having finished second in the Rally Eco Bulgaria. In the 2014 season, she became co-driver world champion as a result of four podiums obtained paired with Guerrini, having finished in second place at the Ecorally della Mendola, the Rally Eco Bulgaria and the Hi-Tech in Athens and third place at the Tesla Rally in Belgrade.

In other media
In 2015, Barciulli made her film debut in Sergio Castellitto's film You Can't Save Yourself Alone.

References

External links

 

1986 births
Living people
Italian rally drivers
Italian rally co-drivers
Sportspeople from Florence
FIA E-Rally Regularity Cup drivers